César Plasencia (born Sacramento, California is a former U.S. soccer midfielder who played professionally in both Mexico and the United States.  He is the head coach of the Cosumnes River College women's soccer team.

Youth and college
Plasencia grew up in Sacramento, California and attended Christian Brothers High School.  Following graduation from high school, he attended Cosumnes River College where he played on the men's soccer team.   After two years, he moved to California State University, Sacramento for a single season.  In 1990, he completed his coursework and graduated with a bachelor's degree in communications.  Plasencia played for a variety of local amateur teams including Jalisco and Sacramento United.

Playing career
In 1986, he moved to Mexico where he signed with First Division club Atlas.  In 1989, he returned to the U.S. to play for the expansion Sacramento Senators of the Western Soccer League.  The Senators folded at the end of the 1989 season and the WSL merged with the east-coast based American Soccer League (ASL) to form the American Professional Soccer League (APSL).  Plasencia moved to Real Santa Barbara for the 1990 APSL season, but Santa Barbara folded at the end of the season.  Plasencia made one more move, to the Salt Lake Sting, but once again, his team folded at the end of the season and Plasencia retired from playing professionally.

Coaching career
In 1993, Plasencia was hired as an assistant coach for the men's soccer team at Cosumnes River College.  He spent three years at Cosumnes before moving to California State University, Sacramento where he was again an assistant coach with the men's soccer team.  However, in 2004, Cosumnes River College hired Plasencia as the head coach for the women's soccer team.

In February 2004, California State University, Sacramento inducted Plasencia into the school's Athletic Honor Roll.

References

External links
 Cosumnes River College coaching profile

Living people
American expatriate soccer players
Atlas F.C. footballers
Western Soccer Alliance players
Sacramento Senators (WSL) players
American Professional Soccer League players
Real Santa Barbara players
Salt Lake Sting players
American soccer coaches
Sacramento State Hornets men's soccer players
Soccer players from Sacramento, California
American soccer players
Association football forwards
Association football midfielders
Year of birth missing (living people)